Jude Bijou (born 1946 in Ann Arbor, Michigan) is a licensed psychotherapist, lecturer, and multi-award winning author of Attitude Reconstruction: A Blueprint for Building a Better Life (Riviera Press, Revised November 2011). Her approach to understanding and integrating human behavior is based on 33 years of private practice therapy with individuals and couples. Jude Bijou is the daughter of pioneer behavioral child psychologist, Sidney W. Bijou, holds a Bachelor of Arts degree from Reed College, as well as a Master’s in psychology from Carleton University.

Teaching and Speaking
Jude is currently a writer, speaker, and frequent radio guest residing in Santa Barbara, CA. Jude Bijou has taught “How to Communicate Simply, Lovingly, and Effectively” through Santa Barbara City College Adult Education for twenty years.  She also lectures on topics such as “Gracefully Dealing With Emotions And Negative Thoughts” (Cottage Hospital Psychiatric Grand Rounds, Santa Barbara CA, December 2012), and “Emotions, Thoughts, Feelings, And Change” (California Association of Marriage and Family Therapists, Santa Barbara, June 2011).

Bijou has taught Introductory Psychology at Carleton University in Ottawa, Ontario, Canada, Re-evaluation Co-Counseling in Santa Barbara California, and Attitude Reconstruction trainings and workshops.

References

American women writers
1946 births
Living people
21st-century American women